Don Myrah (born January 17, 1966) is an American cyclist. He competed in the men's cross-country mountain biking event at the 1996 Summer Olympics.

References

External links
 

1966 births
Living people
American male cyclists
Olympic cyclists of the United States
Cyclists at the 1996 Summer Olympics
Sportspeople from Oakland, California